George Kelly Scott (born 20 December 1966), earlier George Cramne, is a retired Swedish professional boxer of Liberian descent. He won the Swedish championship five years in a row, took a silver medal in the Olympic games in Seoul 1988. He became a pro boxer and trained for the legendary Angelo Dundee and won the world champion belt for WBU. He never lost his belt in the ring, but would later have it taken away from him following a disagreement with his manager.

Amateur career
He competed at the 1988 Summer Olympics in Seoul, South Korea, where he won the silver medal in the lightweight (– 60 kg) division. He also won five Swedish Championships before becoming a pro in the United States in 1991.

1988 Olympic results
 Round of 32: Defeated John Nkagala (Malawi) by decision, 5-0
 Round of 16: Defeated Michael Carruth (Ireland) by first-round knockout
 Quarterfinal: Defeated Charlie Kane (Great Britain) by decision, 5-0
 Semifinal: Defeated Nergüin Enkhbat (Mongolia) by decision, 3-2
 Final: Lost to Andreas Zülow (East Germany) by decision, 0-5 (was awarded silver medal)

Pro boxing career
In 1995 he won the WBU World Champion title, which he kept until 1997.

Kickboxing career
Scott lost his first fight in 2005 by unanimous decision. He came back to win his second fight by split decision against former 1988 Olympic boxing bronze medalist Lars Myrberg at the K-1 Rumble of the Kings 2009 in Stockholm.

Professional boxing record

Kickboxing record

References

External links
 
 
 

1966 births
Living people
Lightweight boxers
Boxers at the 1988 Summer Olympics
Olympic boxers of Sweden
Olympic silver medalists for Sweden
Swedish people of Liberian descent
Sportspeople of Liberian descent
Olympic medalists in boxing
Swedish male boxers
Medalists at the 1988 Summer Olympics
20th-century Swedish people
Djurgårdens IF boxers